Belal Hossen is a Bangladeshi cricketer. He made his first-class debut for Chittagong Division in the 2015–16 National Cricket League on 31 October 2015.

References

External links
 

Year of birth missing (living people)
Living people
Bangladeshi cricketers
Chittagong Division cricketers
Place of birth missing (living people)